The Gandhidham–Bhuj section belongs to Western Railway of Kutch district in Gujarat state. It passes through Adipur and Anjar

History
Initially Gandhidham–Bhuj section was a narrow gauge and later it was converted to broad gauge. The railway ran north from the port of Tuna towards Anjar in the Kutch. The railway was financed by the Maharao Khengarji Bawa of Cutch, and the initial section to Anjar was opened in 1905. 
An extension from Anjar to the state capital of Bhuj was later made and lines opened in 1908.

Railway reorganization
Cutch State Railway was merged into the Western Railway on 5 November 1951, at which Gandhidham–Bhuj section was metre gauge. After the gauge conversion, Gandhidham–Bhuj section on 1 June 2001. Some of the trains were extended to Bhuj.

Route
Gandhidham–Bhuj section connects Adipur, Mundra Port, and New Bhuj. Mundra Port link separates at Adipur.

Speed limits
The Gandhidham–Bhuj Section is classified as a Group E-special class line in which  speed should be below 100 km/h.

References

5 ft 6 in gauge railways in India
Railway lines in Gujarat
Transport in Kutch district

1908 establishments in India
Transport in Gandhidham
Railway lines opened in 1908
Transport in Bhuj